Melina Eleni Kanakaredes Constantinides (born April 23, 1967) is an American actress. She is widely known for her roles in U.S. primetime television dramas as Dr. Sydney Hansen in Providence (1999–2002), as Detective Stella Bonasera in CSI: NY (2004–2010), and on the American daytime television drama series Guiding Light as Eleni Andros Cooper (1991–1995).

Early life
Kanakaredes was born in Akron, Ohio, the daughter of Connie (née Temo), a candy company owner, and Harry Kanakaredes, an insurance salesman. She is a second-generation Greek-American and speaks Greek fluently. Her two maternal uncles own and run a candy store in Akron called "Temo's Candy Company", a chocolate store established in its current location by Kanakaredes's grandfather, Christ Temo.

At age eight, Kanakaredes made her stage debut in a production of Tom Sawyer at Weathervane Playhouse in Akron, Ohio. She graduated from the Firestone High School in Akron. She attended Ohio State University for a short time, and then transferred to Point Park College in Pittsburgh, Pennsylvania, where she performed roles in the professional theatre scene there, including the role of Mary Magdalene in Jesus Christ Superstar at Pittsburgh Musical Theater. She graduated from Point Park in 1989 with a Bachelor of Arts degree in theater arts.

Career

Television
Kanakaredes's first television role was on the daytime drama Guiding Light, originating the role of Eleni Andros Cooper from 1991 to 1995. She was nominated twice for a Daytime Emmy Award for her portrayal of Eleni.

Her most high-profile roles on television were as the series protagonist Dr. Sydney Hansen on Providence, which ran for five seasons between 1999 and 2002, and as Det. Stella Bonasera on the CBS drama series CSI: NY. Kanakaredes left CSI: NY in 2010, after six seasons on the program.

Other television credits include NYPD Blue (in a recurring role as reporter Benita Alden during that show's second season), Due South, Oz, The Practice, MTV's The Ben Stiller Show, a Hallmark Hall of Fame adaptation of the Anne Tyler novel Saint Maybe, and Dr Lane Hunter on the Amy Holden Jones TV series The Resident.

Film
Kanakaredes's film appearances include The Long Kiss Goodnight as Trin and 15 Minutes as Nicolette Karas, the girlfriend of Robert De Niro's character. She was considered for the lead role in My Big Fat Greek Wedding but had to turn it down due to her pregnancy.
She played the role of the Greek Goddess Athena in Percy Jackson & the Olympians: The Lightning Thief and starred in the 2013 drama Snitch alongside Dwayne (The Rock) Johnson.

Personal life
Kanakaredes married Peter Constantinides on September 6, 1992. Together, they have two daughters: Zoe (b. 2000) and Karina Eleni (b. 2003). She and her husband, a former restaurant consultant, owned the "Tria Greek Kuzina" in Powell, Ohio, but it has since closed.

Filmography

Film

Television

Video games

Awards and nominations

See also
 List of Greek Americans

References

External links
 
 CSI: NY cast member biography at CBS

1967 births
20th-century American actresses
21st-century American actresses
American people of Greek descent
American soap opera actresses
American television actresses
American video game actresses
Living people
Actresses from Akron, Ohio
Point Park University alumni